Carlton Cold is an Australian beer brewed by Carlton & United Beverages, a subsidiary of the Foster's Group.

Launched in 1993, the original alcohol level for the drink was 4.9%. However, in 2009 it was dropped to 4.0% and recently in 2013 it was dropped down to 3.5%. The availability of Carlton Cold is in 355 mL bottles, and 375 mL cans.

References

External links
Official Page on Foster's Group Website
Official Carlton Cold Website

Foster's Group
Australian beer brands
Products introduced in 1993
1993 establishments in Australia
Asahi Breweries